Lawrence Hummel "Larry" Curry (February 21, 1935 – December 17, 2018) was a Democratic member of the Pennsylvania House of Representatives. He represented the 154th District from 1993 until 2012.

Biography
Curry was born in Camden, New Jersey. He lived in Jenkintown, Pennsylvania and graduated from Jenkintown High School. He received his bachelor's and master's degrees from University of Pennsylvania and another master's degree from Temple University. Curry taught history at the University of the Arts in Philadelphia, Pennsylvania. Curry served on the Montgomery County Board of Commissioners and on the Jenkintown Borough Council.

References

External links
Pennsylvania House of Representatives - Lawrence Curry (Democrat) official PA House website
Pennsylvania House Democratic Caucus - Lawrence Curry official Party website

1935 births
2018 deaths
Politicians from Camden, New Jersey
People from Jenkintown, Pennsylvania
University of Pennsylvania alumni
Temple University alumni
University of the Arts (Philadelphia) faculty
Pennsylvania city council members
Montgomery County Commissioners (Pennsylvania)
Democratic Party members of the Pennsylvania House of Representatives
21st-century American politicians